Multi-communicating is the act of managing many conversations at one time. The term was coined by Reinsch, Turner, and Tinsley (2008), who proposed that simultaneous conversations can be conducted using an ever-increasing array of media, including face-to-face, phone, and email tools for communication. This practice allows individuals to utilize two or more technologies to interact with each other.

Multi Communication has evolved over the years with the rapid development of information and communications technology (ICT) where behavior within new and emerging digital media applications such as Slack and Skype thrive. With the emergence of portable devices, such as laptops, people can use multi-communicating tools during meetings and non-meeting activities.

Currently, the majority of academic research focuses on its professional implications, outlining a number of key factors that shape the act of multi-communicating. For example, the flexibility of communication tempo, the compartmentalization of conversations, topics discussed, and the intensity of interactions are all factors that contribute toward a person's choice to engage in multi communication, as well as their ultimate success with the practice. Notably, many people engage in multiple conversations as a direct response to the requests of others. Employees frequently believe that multi-communication increases their productivity and work efficiency; however, in-depth interviews about the practice of multi-communication has often revealed mixed results. Research has also shown that the most common combinations used for multi-communicating are the telephone and email, followed by text-based messaging (text message, instant message, etc.).

Multi-communicating and multitasking 
Multi-communicating is similar in nature to the notion of multitasking. Differentiating between multi-communicating and media multitasking can be difficult, as both of the terms concern the participation of people in two or more events at the same time.

In essence, multitasking refers to the behavior of performing two or more unrelated tasks concurrently, simply emphasizing task independence and performance concurrency. Multi-communicating, however, involves individuals participating in more than one simultaneous conversations, which not only requires adequate attention to both tasks, but also coordination between each task. The timing and the pace of communication are also, at least partially, controlled by others and must mediate between different times of exchanges.

Therefore, in essence, multi-communicating is a complex form of multitasking.

Multi-communicating departs from multitasking in that it refers specifically to the management of multiple conversations, people, and media—rather than just any task—at the same time.

In addition to multi-communicating, multitasking also includes electronic multitasking  Electronic multitasking entails consuming one-way media while actively performing another activity, such as watching television while doing homework. Invisible whispering consists of secretively using media to communicate with an individual during a meeting, such as texting a person within the same conference room. Lastly, social multitasking involves tasks that are primarily social-interactive, such as switching between face-to-face conversation and texting. While these subcategories have particular defining characteristics, they are largely overlapping with other categories.

Foundational theories 
Multi-communicating primarily builds off Edward T. Hall's work on polychronicity; Erving Goffman's presentation of self; and Richard L. Daft and Robert H. Lengel's theory of media richness.The practice also bears relevance to media ecology and channel expansion theory.

Polychronicity (Hall) 
Turner and Reinsch (2005), who coined the term multi-communicating in 2008, initially introduced the term polychronic communication in one of their first scholarly presentations of the concept to the wider academic community.

Multi-communicating is thus closely related to the work of Edward T. Hall, who coined the term polychronicity in his 1959 book, The Silent Language. In subsequent works, Hall developed the argument that polychronicity is a preference toward participating in several activities at a time.

Media richness theory (Daft and Lengel) 
Another important concept in multi-communication is Richard L. Daft and Robert H. Lengel's research on media richness theory, which concerns how employees choose which technologies to use in the workplace. Daft and Lengel argue that different media have diverse qualities that make them more or less suited for certain interactions.

In their study on the relationship between managerial communication and media selection, Daft and Lengel encourage communication media that emphasizes face-to-face interaction. For example, an interaction, such as an important conversation with a new business partner, will likely be carried out with as rich of a medium as possible. This rich medium would be a communication technology, like Skype or even a face-to-face conversation, which would allow for submersion in the interaction. Conversely, a more casual and routine conversation, such as the making of lunch plans with a coworker, could easily be carried out over a less contextually rich medium like an office chat or a text message.

Multi-communicating takes the medium selection concept from media richness theory and suggests that some of the same characteristics that contribute to making medium choices may also contribute to the reasons a person might multi-communicate. For example, if a conversation is not very complicated or equivocal, a person might be more likely to engage in multiple conversations. A conversation that is more complicated might make it hard for multi-communicating to take place.

Media ecology theory 
Organizational norms shape the frequency and usage of multi-communication within an organization. In this sense, the practice of multi-communicating is a type of multiple media (i.e., multimedia) practice, as people often use more than one media when engaging in multiple conversations.

Media ecology theory centers on the principles that there is a strong connection between media, technology and communication, and how media and communication processes influence human perception, feeling, understanding and value, and usually, all three are used when engaged in multiple conversations in a technology-enriched workplace.

Characteristics and factors

Characteristics 

Research suggests that there are two characteristics that help to determine a person's choice of communication media when engaging in multi-communicating: compartmentalization and flexibility of tempo.

Compartmentalization
Compartmentalization refers to the ability and ease of cross-conversations. For instance, an online chat allows one to move relatively freely from one conversation to another. Cameron and Webster (2011), "a medium with invisibility does not allow visual cues to be exchanged during the interaction, and using two media with invisibility makes it easier to compartmentalize the conversation while multi-communicatiating." In this case, the ability to hide conversations from the multiple communication partners is an important factor of compartmentalization, too.

Flexibility of tempo
Flexibility of tempo refers to the amount of time a person has to respond to a certain message. Face-to-face communication often allows for less flexibility of tempo than does a text message. Most typically, users choose to combine media technologies such as the telephone (described as non-flexible in tempo and partially compartmentalized) with those such as electronic text (described as high in both flexibility and compartmentalization capabilities). Of course, sometimes presence allocators do not have a choice about one or more of the media they engage with. However, specific combinations of communication media may contribute strongly toward the success or, lack thereof, one has with multi-communicating.

Outcome factors

Several factors may help to determine the outcomes of an episode of multi-communicating, including intensity, topic of conversation, equivocality, and the presence allocator themselves.

Intensity of communication 
Intensity of communication is one of the key factors in multi-communicating because it helps to predict the amount of attention and importance a specific conversation holds. Typically, conversation intensity increases with more, simultaneous conversations, a faster pace of conversion, a broader range of topics, and a wider mix of social roles. Social roles are based on the position you hold in a conversation, for example, a supervisor communicating with a subordinate. Overly high intensity has sometimes been reported as a factor for unsuccessful multi-communicating. For example, if a conversation is not very complicated or equivocal, a person might be more likely to engage in multiple conversations. A conversation that is more complicated might make it hard for multi-communicating to take place.

Topic of conversation 
The topics or themes within multi-communicating are another key factor determining overall success. Put simply, the more alike the themes of the simultaneous conversations, the easier it is for the presence allocator to process information and engage in conversation-switching. Similarly, the more divergent the topics or themes of conversation, the bigger the cognitive strain on the presence allocator and the higher the chance for confusion or conversation mix-ups.

Equivocality 
The notion of equivocality is closely related to topic or theme of communication, which may help to determine the success of multi-communicating. Equivocality refers to the possibility for multiple interpretations of an issue. These multiple interpretations can possibly lead to disagreements regarding an issue. Reinsch and Turner (2007), study suggest that the higher the potential for equivocality in a conversation, the more likely an individual is to pick a medium of communication that is rich in contextual cues, or that has high media-richness.

Presence allocator 
Presence allocators will divide their presence among multiple interactions. The physiological and cognitive perspective, is presented in presence allocators, which typically show how people are able to think faster than they are able to speak or type. Thus, most neuroscientific studies imply that we are not truly cognitively capable of multitasking; but just able to switch between tasks. This means that those who are most skilled at apparent multitasking, or multi-communicating, are essentially very quick at juggling their attention between messages.

There are limits to our working memory that in turn restrict our cognitive information processing capabilities.Performance deteriorates when these limits are exceeded. Because of these limits, performing two tasks at the same time or rapidly switching between two tasks results in decreased task performance in terms of accuracy and response time. These problems can be partially alleviated (but not eliminated) by practice.

Overall, research advocates that presence allocators have the most successful experiences with multi-communicating episodes when engaged in multiple conversations with contextually appropriate media around similar topics. Likewise, the frequent reports of unsuccessful multi-communicating episodes include a sense of high intensity, equivocality and theme confusion. In those cases, information overload can occur to the point where a conversation slows down, becomes confounded or altogether stops.

Implications
The first studies of multi-communicating began when instant messaging first became common practice. While the study of multi-communicating is still in its emergent stages, it appears to be increasingly relevant to a fast-paced, multitasking society.

Productivity
Most people indicate that they multi-communicate in order to become more efficient. Barber and Bruin (2020), suggest that, "electronic multitasking can be considered a citizenship behavior when there are benefits to using technology in the workplace." They further explain that electronic multitasking can be efficient when the multi-communication is task-relevant. However, this goal of efficiency has received some mixed results. Despite the notion that getting several things done at once makes us more productive, research has indicated that polychronicity is negatively correlated with deadlines. More specifically, when it comes to communication and multiple conversations many people reveal a breaking point, at which they can no longer juggle synchronous messages. Significant numbers of research subjects also indicate that they prefer to stay away from multi-communicating altogether when it comes to important conversations which require strong attention.

Several scholars also hypothesized that increased workload can influence people engaging in multi-communicating. Since a heavy workload gives people a sense of loss of time, this may result in people compensating by multi-communicating. However, as revealed by related research results, perceived communication overload did not predict meeting multitasking behaviors.

Perceived incivility 
By employing the social exchange theory, which views social behavior as "an exchange of goods, material goods but also non-material ones, such as the symbols of approval or prestige" where "persons that give much to others try to get much from them, and persons that get much from others are under pressure to give much to them."

Carmeno and Webster (2010) examine the relational outcomes of multi-communicating from the following aspects: conversation leveraging, multi-communicating performance, focal individual accessibility, partner's polychronic communication orientation, awareness and media fit. Perceived incivility, "the feeling that someone is being rude, discourteous and displaying a lack for others". In their research, a multi-communicators secrecy in regards to what they are and who they are conversing with led to higher perceptions of incivility. They suggest that multi-communicating has the potential to build up or damage our workplace relationships. And the incivility perceived in multi-communicating may lead to mistrust in working places.

Practical uses

Personal interaction 
Staying 'connected' has become a norm and a habit pervasive at the societal level, especially with the development of new information and communications technologies (ICTs).

Bayer, Campbell, & Ling (2015) explain how individuals internalize and enable social connectedness within their daily lives. The model outlines: types of connection cues; factors that moderate sensitivity to connection norms; and activation paths for connection habits.

However, the question still remains of what "stay connected" really means. One could argue that perhaps it means that their physical presence also determines their social presence. Taking on this concern, Turner & Foss (2018) developed their "attentional social presence theory," which suggests that there are four types of presences when one engages in multiple conversations, each involving the control of one's audience and technology, the choices they make, and how they interact:

 Budgeted presence occurs when someone engages in multiple conversations at once, for instance, talking to one's friend while also sending an email.
 Entitled presence occurs when someone can take one's audience’s technology away or someone takes one's technology away, for instance, someone's in class and the professor asks them to put their phone away.
 Competitive presence occurs when someone tries to persuade other people or group of people to pay attention to them, and one has to compete with their communication technology, for instance, when someone's trying to share a personal story with their friend, but they're on their phone and are not paying attention to them.
 Invitational presence occurs when someone decide to focus on one's audience and someone is making a concrete effort to be in the moment (only one conversation), someone is focused only on that interaction, for instance, one is having a one-on-one conversation with their friend, there is no technology involved and there are no distractions.

In attempts to determine whether social presence can be measured, Biocca, Harms & Burgoon (2003) emphasize the need for understanding of social behavior in mediated environments. They argue that such environments allow researchers to predict and measure differences among interfaces and guide the design of new social environments and interfaces.

Group interactions
Multi-communicating is especially present in team collaborations. In order to be more effective in their workplace, teams would use different platforms for their communication practices. There are a number of communication platforms such as Slack that include multiple social media channels (social networking platforms and instant messaging). The media capabilities of these platforms, including integration for diverse ICTs, enable affordances for both highly adaptable and centralized team communication practices. A recent study shows that team-communication platforms (TCPs) enable affordances for multicommunication and attention allocation, including flexible scaling of media modality and synchronicity.

Another important factor to consider with multi-communicating is the organizational context and the perception of others. In organizational settings, research suggests that the decision by individuals to use informational technologies is influenced by what they observe other members in the organization doing, which is positively correlated to their multi-communicational behaviors.

The perception of what others think about multi-communicating is also another significant predictor on this behaviors. Due to an underlying perception of rudeness or partiality of conversational investment associated with multi-communicating, people will often hide from their conversational partners the fact that they are multi-communicating. However, when people perceive multi-communicating as acceptable within their organizations, they are less likely to feel embarrassed and will engage in such behaviors more often.

Likewise, depending on the organizational culture, multi-communicating can become particularly crucial and bear negative effects in a professional or office setting. Conversely, research suggests that employees who follow organizational communication norms receive higher performance ratings than those who do not. Therefore, if multi-communicating were considered an organizational 'norm', its practice could also bring positive feedback.

Productivity 
Multi-communication can change the ways in which teams work and interact within the organization. An important factor to consider with multi-communicating is the organizational context and the perception of others.

Stephens and Davis (2009) discuss the social influences on electronic multitasking in organizational meetings. ICTshave infiltrated meetings and allowed for a new range of communicative behaviors to emerge. The perception of what others think of the use of ICTs for multitasking, explain why individuals use or don't use CTs to communicate electronically in meetings. Cardon and Dai (2014) examine the nature of mobile phone use in meetings among Chinese professionals. The etiquette associated with mobile phone use differ across cultures, hence multi-communicating via mobile phones in meetings, a practice that is mostly client-based and relationship-based, changes among cultures and across generations.

Relating to this point, Belanger and Watson (2006) made a study exploring how virtual team members structure their use of multiple media to attain strategic goals. In today’s work environment, individuals working in teams must learn to manage their time for communication and coordination, and to add to this complexity, teams can range from completely virtual environments to face-to-face interactions.

Criticisms 
Criticisms of multi-communication theory at large are not prevalent considering that multi-communicating is a relatively newly defined and studied behavior. However, due to the fact that multi-communicating has been largely studied for its professional implications, recent critical research suggests that multi-communicating behavior may have adverse effects on individual productivity, workplace relationships, and stress management.

Psychology 
Cameron (2016) draws from several disciplines, including management and cognitive and social psychology, to provide several misconceptions about multicommunication. After conducting empirical research, she claims that multi-communicating, contrary to popular belief, may render an individual less accessible, less productive, and potentially more rude in certain professional contexts. She points out that multi-communicating behavior, especially among those with a weak ability to focus, has often increased errors, reduced contribution between ongoing conversations, and increased confusion in the workplace. In doing so, many people multi-communicate as an uncontrolled habit rather than a strategic form of communication, offering more negative implications than positive. Cameron, however, does not advocate against multi-communication, but rather for people to better understand their multi-communicating behaviors and to practice multi-communicating more intentionally.

Gender 
The practical implications of multi-communicating have also drawn criticism in gender studies. Paskewitz and Beck (2019) conducted research about texting during workplace meetings and determined that women perceive individuals who practice multi-communicating more negatively than men. At the same time, the gender of the multi-communicator did not play a role in these perceptions.

See also
 Attention management
 Impression management
 Simultaneous communication
 Time management

References

Further reading
 Cameron, A. 2007. "Juggling multiple conversations with communication technology: towards a theory of multi-communicating impacts in the workplace" (dissertation). . Accessed 10 August 2020.
 Gibson, C. B., J. L. Gibbs, T. L. Stanko, P. Tesluk, and S. G. Cohen. 2011. "Including the 'I' in Virtuality and Modern Job Design: Extending the Job Characteristics Model to Include the Moderating Effect of Individual Experiences of Electronic Dependence and Copresence." Organization Science 22(6):1481–99. .
 O'Leary, M. B., M. Mortensen, and A. Woolley. 2011. "Multiple Team Membership: A Theoretical Model of Productivity and Learning Effects for Individuals and Teams." Academy of Management Review 36(3):461–78. .
 Stephens, K. 2007. "The Successive Use of Information and Communication Technologies at Work." Communication Theory 17(4):486–507. .
 Stephens, K. K., J. K. Cho, and D. I. Ballard. 2012. "Simultaneity, Sequentiality, and Speed: Organizational Messages About Multiple-Task Completion." Human Communication Research 38:23–47. .
 Woerner, S., W. Orlikowski, and J. Yates. 2005. "Scaffolding Conversations: Engaging Multiple Media in Organizational Communication." Paper presented at 21st EGOS Colloquium. Berlin.

Communication